Leporinus leschenaulti is a species of Leporinus widely found in the coastal rivers in French Guiana and northern Brazil in South America.

Etymology
It is named in honor of botanist-ornithologist Jean-Baptiste Louis Claude Theodore Leschenault de La Tour (1773–1826), who, along with entomologist Adolphe Jacques Louis Doumerc (1802–1868), provided the type specimen.

References

Géry, J., 1977. Characoids of the world. Neptune City ; Reigate : T.F.H. [etc.]; 672 p. : ill. (chiefly col.) ; 23 cm.

Taxa named by Achille Valenciennes
Taxa described in 1850
Fish described in 1850
Anostomidae